Ventriculus can refer to:
 Ventricle (heart)
 Stomach
 the midgut in insects
 the gizzard in birds